The 1996 Philadelphia Wings season marked the team's tenth season of operation.

Game log
Reference:

(p) - denotes playoff game

Roster
Reference:

See also
 Philadelphia Wings
 1996 MILL season

References

Philadelphia Wings seasons
Philly
1996 in lacrosse